Ou Ambel is a khum (commune) of Serei Saophoan District in Banteay Meanchey Province in north-western Cambodia.

Villages

 Saesen
 Kourothan
 Roung Masin(រោងម៉ាស៊ីន)
 Prohut
 Ou Ambel(អូរអំបិល)

References

Communes of Banteay Meanchey province
Serei Saophoan District